Mark Lewis (born 18 June 1982 in Caerphilly, Wales) was a rugby union player.

A back row player, Mark Lewis came to Pontypridd through the ranks of the Pontypridd Rugby Academy, gaining international honours with Wales at Youth and under 21 level.

He progressed straight into the Celtic Warriors regional squad, although playing a number of games on permit for Pontypridd in the premier division.

In 2004, Mark was signed up by the Blues.

In 2009, after failing to overcome a serious knee injury, and at the age of 26, Mark Lewis called time on his Rugby career.

References

External links
Pontypridd profile
Cardiff Blues profile

1982 births
Living people
Cardiff Rugby players
Pontypridd RFC players
Rugby union players from Caerphilly
Welsh rugby union players